The Evangelical Catholic Church (ECC), formerly known as the Independent Evangelical Catholic Church in America (IECCA), is an Independent Catholic Church headquartered in Chicago, Illinois. Founded in 1997, it claimed about 1,500 members in three parishes in 2014. In 2017, the ECC claimed four parishes in Chicago, Illinois; Bend, Oregon; Providence, Rhode Island; and Watertown, Wisconsin.

The Evangelical Catholic Church uses two creeds: the Apostles' Creed and the Nicene Creed. Its theology differs from that of the Roman Catholic Church in that it permits both men and women, married as well as  unmarried, to become deacons, priests and bishops; accepts gay marriage; encourages divorced and remarried worshipers to receive Communion; and allows birth control.

References

External links

Independent Catholic denominations
Christian organizations established in 1997